Samantha Taylor (born 25 May 1983) is a Canadian equestrian. She competed in two events at the 2008 Summer Olympics.

References

External links
 

1983 births
Living people
Canadian female equestrians
Olympic equestrians of Canada
Equestrians at the 2008 Summer Olympics
Sportspeople from Vancouver